Anushakti Nagar Assembly constituency is one of the 288 Vidhan Sabha (legislative assembly) constituencies of Maharashtra state in western India and Mumbai South-Central (Lok Sabha constituency) .

Overview
Anushakti Nagar (constituency number 172) is one of the 26 Vidhan Sabha constituencies located in the Mumbai Suburban district. Number of electorates in 2009 was 238,902 (male 132,549, female 106,353).

Anushakti Nagar is part of the Mumbai South Central constituency along with five other Vidhan Sabha segments, namely Chembur in Mumbai Suburban district and Dharavi, Sion Koliwada, Wadala and Mahim in the Mumbai City district.

Member of Legislative Assembly

Election results

2019 result

2014 result

2009 result

See also
 Anushakti Nagar
 List of constituencies of Maharashtra Vidhan Sabha

References

Assembly constituencies of Maharashtra
Assembly constituencies of Mumbai
Politics of Mumbai Suburban district